Georges Washington Louis Gilbert de La Fayette (24 December 1779 – 29 November 1849) was the son of Gilbert du Motier, Marquis de Lafayette, the French officer and hero of the American Revolution, and Adrienne de La Fayette. He was named in honor of George Washington, under whom his father served in the Revolutionary War.

Early life
La Fayette was born on Christmas Eve in 1779, while his father was on a one-year return to France. He was christened the next day and named after American General George Washington, with the elder Lafayette saying the gesture was "a tribute of respect and love for my dear friend." From 1783, La Fayette grew up in the Hôtel de La Fayette at 183 rue de Bourbon, Paris.  Their home was the headquarters of Americans in Paris. Benjamin Franklin, John and Sarah Livingston Jay, and John and Abigail Adams met there every Monday. They dined with the La Fayette family as well as with the liberal nobility, such as Clermont-Tonnerre, Madame de Staël, Morellet, and Marmontel.

In 1789, the French Revolution began. After 10 September 1792, in the wake of the September Massacres, La Fayette went into hiding with his tutor, Felix Frestrel. His mother was put under house arrest and, later, in prison. On 22 July 1794, his great-grandmother, Catherine de Cossé-Brissac, duchesse de Noailles, his grandmother, Henriette-Anne-Louise d'Aguesseau, duchesse d'Ayen, and aunt, Anne Jeanne Baptiste Louise, vicomtesse d'Ayen, were guillotined.

Exile from France
In April 1795, Georges was sent to America with Frestrel. While there, he studied at Harvard, and he was a house guest of George Washington at the presidential mansion in Philadelphia, Pennsylvania, and at the Washington family home, Mount Vernon, Virginia.

On 15 October 1795, Georges' mother was sent to join his father and his sisters, Anastasie and Virginie, in the prison fortress of Olmütz. All of their money and baggage were confiscated. On 18 September 1797, the family was released under the terms of the treaty of Campo-Formio (18 October 1797). They recuperated at Lehmkuhlen, Holstein, near his aunt Madame de Montagu and great-aunt Madame de Tessé.

In 1798, Georges returned from America. In 1799, the family moved to Vianen, near Utrecht during the brief time it was the Batavian Republic. Since Georges was turned back at the French border as an exile, he stayed behind with his father, while his mother Adrienne returned to France.  After Napoleon's plebiscite, on 1 March 1800, he restored La Fayette's citizenship, and removed their names from the émigrés list.

Military service and Restoration
Georges entered the army and was wounded at the Battle of Pozzolo in 1800. Later, he was aide-de-camp to General Grouchy at the Battle of Eylau, 1807, where he gave up his horse, at the risk of his own life. Napoleon's distrust of Georges' father's independence rendered promotion improbable, and Georges de La Fayette retired into private life in 1807.

He entered the Chamber of Deputies and voted consistently on the Liberal side. He was away from Paris during the revolution of July 1830, but he took an active part in the Campagne des banquets, which led up to the French Revolution of 1848.

La Fayette's visit to America
Georges accompanied his father on the latter's triumphant visit to America in 1824 and 1825. Throughout most of the long tour, he kept close company with his father's secretary, Auguste Levasseur. They observed a volunteer fire company turnout in New York City.

He met George Washington Parke Custis at Arlington House. He visited Mount Vernon, and he met Thomas Jefferson at Monticello.

Personal life
In 1802, Georges Washington de Lafayette married Emilie Destutt de Tracy, daughter of the Comte de Tracy. Together, they had three daughters and two sons:

 Natalie Renée du Motier de Lafayette (1803–1878), who married Adolphe Périer, a banker and nephew of Casimir Pierre Périer.
 Charlotte Matilde du Motier de Lafayette (1805–1886), who married Maurice de Pusy (1799–1864), the son of Jean-Xavier Bureau de Pusy.
 Clémentine Adrienne du Motier de Lafayette (1809–1886), who married Gustave de Beaumont (1802–1866).
 Oscar Thomas Gilbert Motier de La Fayette (1815–1881) was educated at the École Polytechnique and served as an artillery officer in Algeria. He entered the Chamber of Deputies in 1846 and voted, like his father, with the extreme Left. After the revolution of 1848, he received a post in the provisional government; as a member of the Constituent Assembly, he became secretary of the war committee. After the dissolution of the Legislative Assembly in 1851, he retired from public life, but emerged on the establishment of the third republic, becoming a life senator in 1875.
 Edmond François du Motier de La Fayette (1818–1890) shared his brother's political opinions; Edmond was one of the secretaries of the Constituent Assembly and a member of the senate from 1876 to 1888.

Lafayette and Tracy lived at their family estate LaGrange, outside Paris, where he spent the rest of his life until his death in 1849, at the age of 70.

Legacy
The appearance of the young Georges Washington is known from a painting, The oath of La Fayette at the Fête de la Fédération, 14 July 1790, in which he is standing on the right alongside his father. The painting is on display at the Musée Carnavalet.

See also
 Franco-American alliance
 La Fayette family
 President's House (Philadelphia) – third Presidential mansion

Notes

Not to be confused with  George Washington.
1779 births
1849 deaths
Politicians from Paris
Gilbert du Motier, Marquis de Lafayette
Moderate Republicans (France)
Members of the Chamber of Representatives (France)
Members of the Chamber of Deputies of the Bourbon Restoration
Members of the 1st Chamber of Deputies of the July Monarchy
Members of the 2nd Chamber of Deputies of the July Monarchy
Members of the 3rd Chamber of Deputies of the July Monarchy
Members of the 4th Chamber of Deputies of the July Monarchy
Members of the 5th Chamber of Deputies of the July Monarchy
Members of the 6th Chamber of Deputies of the July Monarchy
Members of the 7th Chamber of Deputies of the July Monarchy
Members of the 1848 Constituent Assembly
Harvard University alumni
French military personnel of the French Revolutionary Wars
French military personnel of the Napoleonic Wars